The 2019–20 PFC Sochi season was their first season in the Russian Premier League, the highest tier of association football in Russia, and their second season as a club.

Season review
On 5 November, Sochi announced that Erik Vardanyan would join the club from FC Pyunik on 1 January 2020.

On 20 November, Sochi announced that Aleksandr Tochilin had resigned as manager, and that Roman Berezovsky had been placed in temporary charge. On 8 December, Sochi announced Vladimir Fedotov as their new Manager on a -year contract.

On 21 January 2020, Russian Premier League club PFC Sochi announced that Kokorin will join them on loan until the end of the 2019–20 season.

On 17 March, the Russian Premier League postponed all league fixtures until April 10 due to the COVID-19 pandemic.

On 1 April, the Russian Football Union extended the suspension of football until 31 May.

On 15 May, the Russian Football Union announced that the Russian Premier League season would resume on 21 June.

On 17 June, FC Rostov announced that six of their players had tested positive for COVID-19, resulting in Rostov's youth team travelling to play their fixture on 19 June.

On 16 July, the Russian Premier League announced that that day's game between Sochi and Tambov would not take place due to an outbreak of COVID-19 within the Sochi squad. Four days later, 20 July, the Russian Premier League announced that the final game of the season between Sochi and Krylia Sovetov also wouldn't take place due to COVID-19 situation within the Sochi team. On 21 July 2020, the Russian Football Union awarded the game 3–0 to Tambov. On 23 July, the RFU assigned Krylia Sovetov a 3–0 victory over Sochi in their cancelled game.

Squad

Out on loan

Transfers

In

 Vardanyan's transfer was announced on the above date, becoming official on 1 January 2020.

Loans in

Out

Loans out

Released

Friendlies

Competitions

Premier League

Results by round

Results

League table

Russian Cup

Squad statistics

Appearances and goals

|-
|colspan="14"|Players away from the club on loan:
|-
|colspan="14"|Players who appeared for Sochi but left during the season:

|}

Goal scorers

Clean sheets

Disciplinary record

References

PFC Sochi seasons
Sochi